Lionel Pigot Johnson (15 March 1867 – 4 October 1902) was an English poet, essayist, and critic (although he claimed Irish descent and wrote on Celtic themes).

Life
Johnson was born in Broadstairs, Kent, England in 1867 and educated at Winchester College.  While at Winchester, Johnson became friends with Frank Russell, 2nd Earl Russell.  The two started a lengthy religious discussion that Russell later published as Some Winchester Letters of Lionel Johnson (1919).

Johnson graduated from New College, Oxford, in 1890 and converted to Catholicism in June 1891. At that time, Johnson introduced Lord Alfred Douglas to his friend Oscar Wilde. Johnson later denounced Wilde in "The Destroyer of a Soul" (1892) and deeply regretted that he had unwittingly initiated the secret homosexual relationship that had devolved into a public scandal.

In 1893, Johnson published what some consider his greatest work, "Dark Angel". During his lifetime, he published: The Art of Thomas Hardy (1894), Poems (1895), and Ireland and Other Poems (1897). Johnson was a member of the Rhymers' Club, and cousin to Olivia Shakespear (who dedicated her novel The False Laurel to him). 

Johnson died of a "cerebral haemorrhage", per an inquest on 8 October 1902, after collapsing in The Green Dragon on Fleet Street in London. The story of Johnson's being struck and killed by a hansom cab is a myth.

Legacy 

 In October 2018, Strange Attractor Press published Incurable: The Haunted Writings of Lionel Johnson, the Decadent Era's Dark Angel, edited by Nina Antonia. 
 Duncan Fallowell included Incurable in his list of books for the books of the year section (2018) in The Spectator. 
 Michael Dirda, in his 5 December 2018 book review for The Washington Post, entitled "The '90s are having a literary moment. That is, the 1890s... " recommended Incurable as a must read. 
 Eric Hoffman reviewed Incurable in the Fortean Times on 25 February 2019, saying "This handsome volume from the excellent Strange Attractor Press includes a lengthy, authoritative introduction by Antonia, which provides biographical and critical contexts...Incurable is an accessible introduction to the work of this minor, yet distinctive, poet." 
 On 1 May 2019 Alan Contreras reviewed Incurable in the Gay and Lesbian Review, saying Johnson's: "writing conjured worlds of the imagination" and called Nina Antonia's illustrated biography "masterful, gorgeously written and packed with carefully researched gossip."
 In the tabletop wargame Warhammer 40,000 the Primarch of the "Dark Angels" Chapter of Space Marines, Lion El Johnson, would appear to be named after Lionel Johnson, the Primarch's Chapter being a reference to his work "Dark Angel"
 Robert Asch, ed. Lionel Johnson: Poetry and Prose. Saint Austin Press, 2021. ISBN  978-1919673004.

References

Bibliography
Twenty one poems written by Lionel Johnson, selected by William Butler Yeats (Dun Emer Press, 1904) online text
Some Winchester Letters of Lionel Johnson, (George Allen & Unwin, London, 1919.)
The collected poems of Lionel Johnson (1953) edited by Ian Fletcher, Unicorn Press, London (reprinted 1982).
Post Liminium. Essays and Critical Papers (1911) edited by Thomas Whittemore, Elkin Mathews, London (reprinted 1968).
Lionel Johnson Victorian Dark Angel by Richard Whittington-Egan, Cappella Archive (2012).
At the Heart of the 1890s: Essays on Lionel Johnson Gary Paterson, AMS Press (2008)
Incurable: The Haunted Writings of Lionel Johnson, the Decadent Era’s Dark Angel edited by Nina Antonia, Strange Attractor Press (2018)
Lionel Johnson: Poetry and Prose  edited by Robert Asch, Saint Austin Press (2021)

External links
 
 
 

1867 births
1902 deaths
English Catholic poets
English essayists
English Roman Catholics
People from Broadstairs
Converts to Roman Catholicism
British gay writers
People educated at Winchester College
Alumni of New College, Oxford
British male essayists
English male poets
19th-century English poets
19th-century English male writers
19th-century essayists
English male non-fiction writers